Weismain (with German article die Weismain) is a river in Upper Franconia, Bavaria, Germany. With about 18 km length, it is a left tributary of the Main near Altenkunstadt. It flows through the town Weismain.

See also
 List of rivers of Bavaria

References

Rivers of Bavaria
Rivers of Germany